Hood Baby 2 is the third studio album by American rapper Lil Gotit. It was released on April 24, 2020, by Alamo Records.

Background
The album features 18 songs and collaborators including Gunna, Lil Keed, Future, Lil Yachty, Guap Tarantino, among others. It was named as a sequel to Gotit's debut studio album Hood Baby, released in 2018. The album initially contained 35 tracks, which was announced back in August 2019. However, it was cut down from its original 35-song track-list to 18 songs.

Singles
On April 10, 2020, "Bricks in the Attic" was released as the lead single from the album. "Never Legit" was released, accompanied with a music video, a week later as the second single, before the release of the album.

Track listing
Credits adapted from Tidal.

Charts

References

Lil Gotit albums
2020 albums
Hip hop albums by American artists